Waris is a Pakistani television drama serial created by PTV, written by Amjad Islam Amjad, directed by Ghazanfer Ali and Nusrat Thakur.

The first episode was aired from PTV-Lahore on Saturday 29 December 1979 and the last on 22 March 1980 and was an acclaimed mega hit. The show had 13 episodes, which is a traditional PTV drama serial format; with each episode almost one hour long.

Plot

A Pakistani feudal lord (zamindar), Chaudhry Hashmat rules his fiefdom, Sikandarpur with an iron grip. Along with his son Chaudhry Yaqub and two grandsons Chaudhry Anwar Ali and Chaudhry Niaz Ali (sons of his deceased son, Chaudhry Ghulam Ali), he struggles to hold on to his land, (Sikanderpur) which is the proposed site for a dam.

The two grandsons are constantly at loggerheads. The younger one, Chaudhry Anwar Ali is a prodigal scion of a feudal family. He is also ruthless, like his grandfather, Chaudhry Hashmat. The older one, Chaudhry Niaz Ali wishes to escape to the big city, Lahore, but is trapped in the feudal web.

There is vicious intra-family feudal politics at play. Chaudhry Yaqub is eyeing the entire estate of his father Chaudhry Hashmat by attempting to pit Chaudhry Anwar Ali against his older brother Chaudhry Niaz Ali. His machinations are carried out by Mauladad, who is an employee of Chaudhry Anwar Ali. Mauladad is a tough, wily guy employed by Chaudhry Anwar Ali to carry out hit-jobs, abductions, etc.

Fateh Sher is an unknown guy, his identity will reveal at climax. Fateh Sher fled to Sikandarpur with his wife Zohra. Zohra was originally engaged to the older nephew of the Chaudhry of Ahmadpur, Hayat Muhammad. Another lead character, Dilawar is the younger nephew of Hayat Muhammad. Zohra's marriage with Fateh Sher causes strife in the village and they have to run for their lives. After moving to Sikandarpur, they start a new life and Fateh Sher assumes a new identity.

Meanwhile, a blood feud ensues between the families of Hayat Muhammad and that of Fateh Sher. In rural Punjabi culture, it is a huge insult for a man, if his fiancé marries someone else. To avenge this grave insult, Dilawar's older brother launches a failed attack on Fetah Sher's village, where police were lying in wait in anticipation of an attack. To save his older brother, Dilawar gives a false statement to the police saying he launched the attack and not his brother. For this (false) acknowledgement, Dilawar is sentenced to ten years in prison. While Dilawar is serving his term, his older brother goes out to seek and kill Fateh Sher. But before he can get to Fateh Sher, Fateh Sher kills him. These events catalyze a deep rage and hatred in Dilawar against Fateh Sher. Upon his release from prison, he only has one purpose in life - to seek out and kill Fateh Sher.

Fateh Sher was last spotted in Sikandarpur, the fiefdom of Chaudhry Hashmat. It is very difficult for any outsider to come to Sikandarpur without attracting the scrutiny of Chaudhry Hashmat and his servants. To get to Sikandarpur, Dilawar starts working as a servant for Chaudhry Yaqub in Lahore. When Chaudhry Hashmat visits his son Chaudhry Yaqub in Lahore to purchase a high-pedigree dog (Crystal) from Saulat Mirza, the latter turns down all offers, infuriating Chaudhry Hashmat who is not used to taking no for an answer. Seizing the opportunity to earn Chaudhry Hashmat's favor, Dilawar steals the prized dog, Crystal, from Saulat Mirza and brings it to Chaudhry Hashmat. This act endears Dilawar to Chaudhry Hashmat and lets Dilawar into Chaudhry Hashmat's inner circle of confidants and servants. Chaudhry Hashmat takes Dilawar with him to Sikandarpur.

Ironically, the first and only true friend Dilawar makes in Sikandarpur is Mauladad, who in reality is his nemesis Fateh Sher - the person Dilawar is seeking to find and kill.

Cast 
 Abid Ali as Dilawar
 Mehboob Alam as Chaudhry Hashmat Khan
 Uzma Gillani as Zakiya Ghulam Ali
 Samina Ahmad as Sughra
 Firdous Jamal as Chaudhry Anwar Ali
 Ghayyur Akhtar as Chaudhry Hayat Muhammad
 Nighat Butt as Zubaida (Wife of Chaudhry Yaqub)
 Tahira Naqvi as Seemi
 Talat Siddiqui as Dilawar's mother
 Faryal Gohar as Shehzadi	
 Munawwar Saeed as Chaudhry Yaqub
 Shujaat Hashmi as Mauladad / Fateh Sher
 Aurangzeb Leghari as Chaudhry Niaz Ali
 Agha Sikandar as Farrukh
 Sajjad Kishwar as Sher Muhammad
 Muhammad Ayub as Master Ji
 Amanullah as Cheema Maachi

Notes

References

External links 

1970s Pakistani television series
Pakistani drama television series
Pakistan Television Corporation original programming
Urdu-language television shows